Domingo Rodríguez (4 August 1885 – 11 March 1968) was a Spanish sports shooter. He competed in seven events at the 1920 Summer Olympics.

References

External links
 

1885 births
1968 deaths
Spanish male sport shooters
Olympic shooters of Spain
Shooters at the 1920 Summer Olympics
Sportspeople from the Province of Valladolid
20th-century Spanish people